Mustafá Abdesalam Mohand (born 5 April 1975), known as Chota, is a Spanish former footballer who played as a striker.

He played mostly for Melilla in a 22-year senior career, appearing in 367 competitive games for the club and scoring 87 goals.

Club career
Born in Melilla, Chota spent his first years as a senior in amateur football. He played part of the 2001–02 season and the entire 2002–03 campaign with Levante UD in the Segunda División, scoring his first goal in the competition on 13 January 2002 in a 1–1 home draw against Albacete Balompié. He also had a brief spell in that tier with CD Numancia.

Most of Chota's career, however, was spent with UD Melilla in the Segunda División B (which he first joined in 1996 in order to represent its reserves), going on to surpass the 300-mark in official matches and score more than 75 goals. He retired at the end of 2014–15 at the age of 40, amidst accusations of mistreatment.

References

External links

1975 births
Living people
Spanish Muslims
Spanish sportspeople of Moroccan descent
Spanish footballers
Moroccan footballers
Footballers from Melilla
Association football forwards
Segunda División players
Segunda División B players
Tercera División players
CD Don Benito players
Alicante CF footballers
CD Dénia footballers
CF Gandía players
Atlético Levante UD players
Levante UD footballers
CD Numancia players
Hércules CF players
UD Melilla footballers